Wars of In-Laws (Traditional Chinese: 我的野蠻奶奶) is a TVB costume comedy series broadcast in July 2005. It stars Liza Wang, Myolie Wu & Bosco Wong.

An indirect modern sequel, Wars of In-Laws II (野蠻奶奶大戰戈師奶) was produced and broadcast in 2008 continued with Liza Wang, Myolie Wu, and Bosco Wong.

Synopsis
The mother is unruly.
The wife is a shrew.
The poor son is stuck between the two.

Tin Lik (Myolie Wu) is the daughter of a bandit and she married into the Ling family by coincidence. When she was escaping from guards, she fled to the vehicle that was going to transport the bride. But the real bride had already eloped with another man. Therefore, in order to escape from the guards, Tin Lik had to be the imposer. Tin Lik's mother-in-law, Hei Tap-Lap (Liza Wang), is very barbaric. They always argue with each other and Tin Lik's husband, Ning Mao-Chun (Bosco Wong), always gets caught in the crossfire. He has to please his mother and wife at the same time.

Mao-Chun is a very timid guy. But no one knows that he is actually a hero that uses his martial arts to steal from corrupted officials, taking the money and giving it to the poor. He is known as the "nameless" hero. Once he appeared at a charity function to teach a corrupted official a lesson of justice, but ends up saving Tin Lik instead. From that day onwards, Tin Lik found herself falling in love with "nameless". She would later discover that "nameless" is really Mao-Chun. Tin Lik's true identity as a bandit, is also accidentally revealed to her family causing a reason for her mother-in-law to get rid of her. Will her love with Mao-Chun keep them inseparable....?

Cast

Awards and nominations
Wars of In-Laws won the "Best Drama" Award, at the 38th TVB Anniversary Awards in 2005.
Liza Wang won her second "Best Actress in a Leading Role" Award for her role Hei Tap-Lap, at the 38th TVB Anniversary Awards in 2005.
Bosco Wong won the "Most Vastly Improved Actor" Award for his role Ning Mao Chun, at the 38th TVB Anniversary Awards in 2005.

Viewership ratings

References

External links
TVB.com Wars of In-Laws - Official Website 

TVB dramas
2005 Hong Kong television series debuts
2005 Hong Kong television series endings